Walibi Belgium is a Belgian theme park located in Wavre, close to Brussels. It is one of the largest theme parks in Belgium, attracting 1.45 million visitors in 2018 (including visitors to adjoining water park Aqualibi). The park was originally called Walibi, then Walibi Wavre, and then Six Flags Belgium, until the current name was affixed in 2004. Between 1998 and 2004, the park was owned by Six Flags, Inc until Six Flags sold it to Palamon Capital Partners (which operated the park under its StarParks Group division). Palamon sold the park in 2006 to Compagnie des Alpes, which has owned it since. Walibi Belgium is the first of the Walibi chain of parks, and the Walibi name is a syllabic abbreviation of the three nearby towns in the Belgian province of Walloon Brabant, where the park is located: Wavre, Limal and Bierges,

History

The park was founded in 1975 by Belgian Eddy Meeùs under the banner "Walibi," using the local towns Wavre, Limal, and Bierges as a naming device, and adopting the wallaby, a macropod cousin of the kangaroo, as its mascot. In its early years, the park featured a water-skiing area, which lasted until 1994. In 1987, a waterpark, Aqualibi, opened next door. The park had some Tintin rides from 1975 to 1995, when it lost the rights to the franchise.

In 1998, the park was bought by Six Flags, and the name was changed from Walibi Wavre to Six Flags Belgium in 2001.

In 2004, Six Flags sold its European division to Palamon Capital Partners, a London-based investment company.

On 7 November 2004 Six Flags Belgium officially ceased to exist. Any references to Looney Tunes and DC Comics characters had to be removed before the beginning of the 2005 season. The park reopened its gates on 26 March 2005, bearing the "Walibi Belgium" name.

In 2006, the park was taken over by CDA Parks, a French leisure group.
In 2017, the park announced a 100 million euro make-over, featuring a re-theme of 75% of the park and adding several new rides. One of them being an Intamin megacoaster.

From 2012 to 2014, the Aqualibi waterpark underwent a major refurbishment, costing €11 million (US$16 million).

Rides

Present rides

Roller coasters

Water rides

Thrill rides

Family rides

Dark rides

Former rides

Roller coasters

Thrill rides

Family rides

Events

Summer Nights 
During 5 Saturdays in a row in July and August, Walibi Belgium has their late night openings. During those nights, the park remains open until 11:00 p.m. and offers additional entertainment. Each night ends with a firework show around the lake, sometimes with a themed show.

Halloween 
One of the events the park is known for is Halloween, traditionally during the last weekends of October and autumn holiday in Belgium. During Halloween, Walibi Belgium transforms into hell on earth with scary entertainment and other festivities. The park started celebrating Halloween in 2000 on a small scale, leading it to be one of the biggest Halloween events in Belgium, the Netherlands and Luxembourg.

Since 2008, Walibi Belgium introduced a storyline around the event which is still running in 2013. Every year, the story has an open ending, making visitors curious for the following year. This happens during a finale show, including special effects, music and actors. The park also creates scare-zones, zones in the park that get a Halloween theme. The park is also known for their number of haunted houses during Halloween. For 2012 and 2013, guests were welcomed in 6 different haunted houses spread over the park. The haunted houses the park offers are nowadays known for their often strange locations and aggressive and violent actors.

For 4 to 5 days, the park also has Halloween nights, with the park being opened till 9:00 p.m.

See also 
 Bellewaerde
 Walibi Holland
 Walibi Rhône-Alpes

References

External links 

 Walibi Belgium website

Amusement parks in Belgium
Compagnie des Alpes
1975 establishments in Belgium
Buildings and structures in Walloon Brabant
Tourist attractions in Walloon Brabant
Wavre
Amusement parks opened in 1975